Choe Chol-Man (Chinese: 崔哲萬; born September 22, 1985) is a North Korean international association football player.

Choe has made six appearances for the Korea DPR national football team in 2006 FIFA World Cup qualifying matches.

International goals

Korea DPR

Korea DPR U23

References 

1985 births
Living people
North Korean footballers
North Korea international footballers
April 25 Sports Club players
Footballers at the 2006 Asian Games
Association football forwards
Asian Games competitors for North Korea